Endless Plans is a supplement for fantasy role-playing games published by Endless Games in 1982.

Contents
Endless Plans are floor plans with feint dots printed on them at intervals of 2 scale meters, to assist the referee.

Publication history
Endless Plans was produced as a total of eight sets.

Reception
Doug Cowie reviewed Endless Plans for Imagine magazine, and stated that "Many will prefer the rather stark EP approach. One big plus EPs have [over] other sets is the inclusion of a useful instruction pamphlet."

References

Fantasy role-playing game supplements
Role-playing game mapping aids
Role-playing game supplements introduced in 1982